Tennessee Pass may refer to:
Tennessee Pass (Colorado), a mountain pass between Eagle and Lake counties, Colorado, United States.
Tennessee Pass Line, a closed rail line over the pass
Tennessee Pass (Oregon), a mountain pass in Josephine County, Oregon, United States.

See also